is a Japanese professional footballer who plays as an attacking midfielder or a winger for  club Kashiwa Reysol.

Career
Keiya Sento joined J2 League club Kyoto Sanga FC in 2017 and played 99 games for the club over three seasons. In May 2019, he won the J2 League Monthly MVP award after scoring three goals and providing two assists in five games. after three seasons joined J1 League club Yokohama F. Marinos in 2020. After playing only three games for Marinos, Sento was loaned back to Kyoto Sanga in the same season and eventually moved on at the end of the season to Sagan Tosu. Sento then joined Nagoya Grampus for the 2022 season. After playing 45 games for Nagoya, Sento then moved on again after one season, this time joining fellow J1 League team Kashiwa Reysol for the 2023 season.

Club statistics

References

External links
Profile at Nagoya Grampus

1994 births
Living people
Toyo University alumni
Association football people from Osaka Prefecture
People from Hirakata
Japanese footballers
J1 League players
J2 League players
Yokohama F. Marinos players
Kyoto Sanga FC players
Sagan Tosu players
Nagoya Grampus players
Kashiwa Reysol players
Association football midfielders